The Border Legion (TV edit: West of the Badlands) is a 1940 American Western film directed by Joseph Kane and written by Olive Cooper and Louis Stevens. It is based on the 1916 novel The Border Legion by Zane Grey. The film stars Roy Rogers, George "Gabby" Hayes, Carol Hughes, Joe Sawyer, Maude Eburne and Jay Novello. The film was released on December 5, 1940, by Republic Pictures.

Plot

Cast 
Roy Rogers as Dr. Stephen Kellogg aka Steve Kells 
George "Gabby" Hayes as Honest John Whittaker
Carol Hughes as Alice Randall
Joe Sawyer as Jim Gulden
Maude Eburne as Hurricane Hattie McGuire
Jay Novello as Santos
Hal Taliaferro as Sheriff Amos Link
Dick Wessel as Oscar Red McGooney 
Paul Porcasi as Tony 
Robert Emmett Keane as Officer Willets

Production
The Border Legion was edited for television to be 54 minutes in duration. The television title of this film is West of the Badlands.

References

External links
 

1940 films
Films based on works by Zane Grey
American Western (genre) films
1940 Western (genre) films
Republic Pictures films
Films directed by Joseph Kane
American black-and-white films
1940s English-language films
1940s American films